Dimataling, officially the Municipality of Dimataling (Subanen: Benwa Dimataling; Chavacano: Municipalidad de Dimataling), is a 4th class municipality in the province of Zamboanga del Sur, Philippines. According to the 2020 census, it has a population of 31,340 people.

Dimataling was created in 1950 from the barrios of Dinas, Legarda, Mirapao, Migpulao, Kalipapa, Pisaan, Bubway, Tiniguangan, Tabina and Dimataling from Pagadian (not yet as a city at that time) and the barrios of Punta Flecha, Pitogo, Qugbay, Balong-balong, Libertad and Dumanguilas from Margosatubig.

Geography

Barangays
Dimataling is administratively subdivided into 24 barangays.

Climate

Demographics

Economy

References

External links
 Dimataling Profile at PhilAtlas.com
 [ Philippine Standard Geographic Code]
Philippine Census Information

Municipalities of Zamboanga del Sur